"I'll See You Later Yankeeland" is a World War I song written  and composed by Charles K. Harris. The song was self-published in 1917 by Charles K. Harris in New York, NY. The sheet music cover features a photo of soldiers waving from the deck of a ship.

The sheet music can be found at the Pritzker Military Museum & Library.

References

Bibliography
Parker, Bernard S. World War I Sheet Music 1. Jefferson: McFarland & Company, Inc., 2007. . 
Paas, John Roger. 2014. America sings of war: American sheet music from World War I. . 

1917 songs
Songs of World War I
Songs written by Charles K. Harris